Yury Viktorovich Belyayev (born 28 August 1947) is a Soviet and Russian film and theatre actor. He has received the title of Honored Artist of the Russian Federation  (1995) and the USSR State Prize (1991).

Biography 
In Belyayev began studying at drama school Stupinskaya Studio (Theatre Youth) under the direction of O. Livanova. After leaving school he worked in a factory, he served in the Soviet Army, worked as an instructor DOSAAF, a janitor.

In 1975, Belyayev graduated from the Shchukin Theatre School (course of Lyudmila Stavskaya). In the same year he became an actor of the Moscow Taganka Theater.

Personal life 
In May 2014 he married the actress Tatiana Abramova. From his first marriage he had two children, a daughter Olga and son Alexey.

Selected filmography
 1979 —  On the Trail of the Ruler as Belov
 1983 —  The Mystery of Blackbirds as Percival Fortescue
 1985 —  Gunpowder as Nikonov
 1985 —  Aliens Do Not Go Here as Chumakov 
 1986 —  Descended from Heaven as Hero of the Soviet Union Ivan Ivanovich
 1987 —  Moonzund as Alexander Kolchak
 1987 —  Once Lies as Alexander Grigorievich Kryukov, artist
 1987 —  The Veldt as Michael
 1988 —  The Servant as Pavel Sergeyevich Klyuev
 1991 —  The Assassin of the Tsar as Alexander II of Russia
 1993 —  The Woman in the Window as Valerian Chernyshov
 1995 —  A Play for a Passenger as Kuzmin
 1997 —  The Countess de Monsoreau as the Comte de Monsoreau
 1997 —  The Thief  as Sanya (at 48 years old)
 1997 —  The Circus Burned Down and the Clowns Ran Away  
 1999 —  Russian Riot as Commandant Mironov
 2002 —  Family Secrets as Alexander Ermakov
 2003 —  Tabloid Paperback
 2005 —  Escape as father of Irina
 2005 —  KGB in a Tuxedo as KGB's general
 2006 —  The Red Room as director
 2006 —  Diamonds for Dessert as Pavlik
 2007 —  Cadets as Colonel Kalashnikov
 2007 —  Kuka as Nikita  
 2007 —  Teacher in Law as Boris Bogomolov
 2008 —  The Kremlin Cadets as Lt. Gen. Romanenko
 2008 —  White-Bear as Leonid Pavlovich Hrjapa
 2009 —  The US Government against Rudolph Abel as Rudolf Abel
 2009 —  Taras Bulba as Kirdyaga, ataman
 2009 —  Justice Wolves as Sergey
 2010 —  Kandagar as Sokovatov
 2012 —  Once in Rostov as Matvey Shaposhnikov, Lt. Gen.
 2012 —  Cordon Investigator Savelyev as Boris Kolotov
 2015 —  The Alchemist. Elixir of Faust as the official Ministry of Health
2017 — Sleepers as Alexander Ilyich Nefyodov
2017 — Godunov as Ivan Shuisky
2022 — Aeterna as Cardinal Sylvester

References

External links
 

1947 births
Living people
People from Omsk Oblast
Soviet male film actors
Russian male film actors
Soviet male stage actors
Russian male stage actors
20th-century Russian male actors
21st-century Russian male actors
Recipients of the USSR State Prize
Honored Artists of the Russian Federation